National Normal University was a teacher's college in Lebanon, Ohio.  Located in southwestern Ohio, it opened in 1855 as Southwestern Normal School and took the name National Normal University in 1870.  Alfred Holbrook was the first president and the school's guiding force for most of its existence. He resigned in 1897 after 42 years. In 1907 the NNU became public and changed its name to Lebanon University.
The school went bankrupt in and finally closed in 1917.  The school merged with Wilmington College in Wilmington, Ohio. The Warren County (Ohio) Historical Society in Lebanon, Ohio, now holds Lebanon University's records.
In 1933 Alfred Holbrook College opened on the same campus. AHC moved to Manchester, Ohio where it closed in 1941. The original campus was demolished in 1977.

Notable alumni
Stanley P. V. Arnold, an Illinois state representative and newspaper editor
Horatio C. Claypool, United States Representative from Ohio
Myers Y. Cooper, former Governor of Ohio 
Clement L. Brumbaugh, United States Representative from Ohio
Francis B. De Witt, United States Representative from Ohio
Lucien J. Fenton, United States Representative from Ohio
William T. Fitzgerald, United States Representative from Ohio
John W. Harreld, United States Representative and Senator from Oklahoma
Cordell Hull, United States Senator from Tennessee and Secretary of State under President Franklin D. Roosevelt
James R. Keaton, Justice of the Oklahoma Territorial Supreme Court.
Isaac C. Ketler, Presbyterian scholar, founder of Grove City College
Andrew Armstrong Kincannon, Chancellor of the University of Mississippi
Monroe Henry Kulp, United States Representative from Pennsylvania
John J. Lentz, United States Representative from Ohio
John A. McDowell, United States Representative from Ohio
Thomas Corwin Mendenhall, autodidact physicist and meteorologist
Stephen Morgan, United States Representative from Ohio
Will E. Neal, United States Representative from West Virginia
Miner G. Norton, United States Representative from Ohio
James D. Post, United States Representative from Ohio
John M. Robsion, United States Representative and Senator from Kentucky
F. E. Riddle (judge), Attorney and Associate Justice of the Oklahoma Supreme Court
Addison E. Southard, American diplomat
W. D. Twichell (Class of 1883, civil engineering), Texas surveyor
George M. Wertz, United States Representative from Pennsylvania
Edward E. Moore, Indiana state senator and Los Angeles City Council member
Mary Creegan Roark, first female president of Eastern Kentucky University

See also
Normal school

References

External links
 Ohio Historical Society article

Defunct private universities and colleges in Ohio
Education in Warren County, Ohio
Educational institutions established in 1855
Educational institutions disestablished in 1917
1855 establishments in Ohio
1917 disestablishments in Ohio